Martyrs' Church (Nahadagats Church) is an Armenian Evangelical Church located in Souleimaniye district of Aleppo, Syria. The origin of the church goes back to 1865, Aintab, Turkey, where the congregation of the first Armenian Evangelical - Kayajik church decided to split into two groups. Those who agreed to move out, started a second church at Hayik quarter of the city. The first pastor of the church was Rev. Kara Krikor Haroutyounian served the church until his death in 1907. Rev. Manaseh Papazian also served as associate pastor from 1892–1907. He was followed by Rev. Bedros Topalian (1907–1912). During those years, the church ran an elementary and intermediate school called Niziblian School (founded by the benevolent Mr. Adoor Niziblian). Several pastors took over the leadership of the church until 1921, when all the Armenians of Aintab were forced out of the city as part of the Kemalist government's policy racist policy.

History of the church in Aleppo
In 1931, seventeen members of the former Hayik Church came together and founded the Nahadagatz (Martyrs') church in Aleppo. The name was chosen to commemorate the Armenian Martyrs who lost their lives under the Ottoman regime (1914–1918). The first pastor of the church was Rev. Hagop Chakmakjian. The congregation first met in an old courtyard close to the Salibe Christian Quarter, then moved to a rented building which was known at that time as the Armenian Red Cross building in Suleymaniye Street. In 1965, the church board decided to purchase an estate in Soulemaniye quarter to build its permanent sanctuary and the parsonage on it. From the time of its founding, the church played a great role in the formation of the Christian, moral and national character of hundreds of children, teenagers, youth and grown ups who attended its services.

The church is located in Sulemaniye quarter, Aleppo, Syria. The origin of its foundation goes back to 1865, Aintab, Turkey. When the members of the first Armenian Evangelical church of the town (known as Kayajik church) grew in number, the congregation and the serving pastors decided to split into two groups. One of the groups moved to a nearby neighborhood called Hayik and established a separate church there. The first pastor of this new congregation was Rev. Kara-Krikor Harutyunian, who has served the church until he died in 1907 and with whom Rev. Manaseh Papazian has collaterally served as an associate pastor from 1892–1907, followed by Rev. Bedros Topalian (1907–1912). During these years, the church had run an elementary and intermediate Niziblian School (founded by the benevolent Mr. Adoor Niziblian). Then several pastors took over the leadership of the church until 1921, when all the Armenians of Aintab were forced out of the city. Professor Lutfi Levonian was the last preacher of the church in Aintab, Turkey era.

When the Armenians were relocated in Aleppo, the evangelical congregation of the Hayik church started to attend the church services of the newly founded Armenian Evangelical Emmanuel church. Things went this way until 1930 when 33 of the former "Hayik" church families decided to split and reestablish another church. Thus, in 1931 and with the official recognition of the Union of the Armenian Evangelical churches of Near East, the Nahadagatz (Martyrs') church was born.
The name "Nahadagatz"  was chosen to commemorate the Armenian Martyrs' who have suffered the atrocities of the Young Turks' regime between the years 1914–1918. The first pastor of the church was Rev. Hagop Chakmakjian. At the beginning, the congregation used to meet in an ancient courtyard close to the Salibe Christian quarter, then in 1936 the church moved to a rented building which was known at that time as the "Armenian Red Cross building" in Sulemaniye neighborhood. In 1960, the church board bought a new lot in Sulemaniye and after securing the necessary funds built its permanent sanctuary, which was officially inaugurated on 14 March 1965.

Dr. Haroutune Nazarian (1907–2002) is always remembered as one of the most committed lay members of the church who implemented his passion, vision, and service for "Nahadagatz" throughout his life.

From the time of its foundation, the church has played a major role in the formation of the Christian, moral and ethnic character of hundreds of Armenian children, teenagers, youth and adults who have attended its services.

Although beginning in the 1980s many of its families left the country and emigrated to the West and the membership of the church diminished, the church still carries on the mission of its founders. Besides the regular Sunday services, the church also runs a Sunday school for children, summer DVBS, CE Youth association, Ladies auxiliary and newlywed families' meetings.

Nahadagatz Church is a member of Union of the Armenian Evangelical Churches in the Near East (UAECNE).

List of the pastors, preachers and the pulpit administrators (PA) who served in the church

Aintab era (Hayik Church)
Rev. Kara-Krikor Harutyunian (Pastor - 1865–1907)
Rev. Manaseh Papazian (Pastor - 1892–1907) as an associate pastor.
Rev. Bedros Topalian (Pastor - 1908–1912)
Prof. Lutfi Levonian (Preacher - 1912–1915)
Armenian Genocide years
Various preachers (1919–1920)
Rev. Garabed Ketenjian (Preacher - 1920)
Rev. Yenovk Hadidian (Preacher - 1920)
Prof. Lutfi Levonian (Preacher - 1920–1921)
Aleppo era (Nahadagatz)
Rev. Hagop Chakmakjian (Pastor - 1931–1939)
Rev. Dikran Khrlopian (Pastor - 1939–1948)
Mr. Mihran Balikian (Preacher and (PA) - 1948)
Rev. Assadour Marganian (Pastor - 1948–1952)
Mr. Mihran Balikian (Preacher and (PA) - 1952–1953)
Rev. Nerses Khatchadourian (Preacher and (PA) - 1953–1955)
Rev. Assadour Sadakian (Pastor - 1955–1973)
Rev. Hovanness Karjian and Rev. Barkev Apartian (1973–1974) -
Rev. Barkev Orchanian (Preacher and (PA) - 1975)
Past.  Soghomon Kilaghbian / Mr. Bedros Kelligian / Rev. Hovanness Sarmazian / Rev. Calvin Barsoumian / Rev. Avedis Zarifian (1976–1977)
Dr. Raffi Balabanian (Preacher and (PA) -  1978-1980)
Pastor Norayr Orchanian (Pastor - 1978)
Pastor Mher Khachigian (Pastor - 1980–1985)
Pastor Avedis Boynerian (Preacher and (PA) - 1985)
Rev. Lutfi Haidostian /  Rev. Hagop Sagherian (1986)
Pastor Mgrdich Melkonian (Preacher and (PA) - 1986–1987)
Rev. Avedis Boynerian (Pastor - 1987–2003)
Pastor Vatche Ekmekjian (Preacher and (PA) - 2003–2004)
Rev. Vatche Ekmekjian (Pastor - 2004–2010)
Rev. Simon Der Sahagian (Pastor - 2011–present)

References

Armenian churches in Syria
Christian organizations established in 1931
Churches in Aleppo
Armenian Evangelical churches
Churches completed in 1931